Alloplectus is a genus of Neotropical plants in the family Gesneriaceae. A recent revision of the genus includes five species, with the majority of species in the genus as traditionally circumscribed being transferred to Crantzia, Glossoloma, and Drymonia.

Species
 Alloplectus aquatilis C.V. Morton 
 Alloplectus hispidus (Kunth) Mart. 
 Alloplectus inflatus J.L. Clark & L.E. Skog 
 Alloplectus tessmannii Mansf. 
 Alloplectus weirii (Kuntze) Wiehler

Transferred species
 Alloplectus herthae = Glossoloma herthae
 Alloplectus martinianus = Glossoloma martinianum
 Alloplectus penduliflorus = Glossoloma penduliflorum
 Alloplectus tetragonus = Glossoloma tetragonum

References

External  links
 Alloplectus in A. Weber & L. E. Skog 2007, Genera of Gesneriaceae.

Gesnerioideae
Taxonomy articles created by Polbot
Gesneriaceae genera